Church Shocklach is a former civil parish, now in the parish of Shocklach Oviatt and District, in Cheshire West and Chester, England.  It contains three buildings that are recorded in the National Heritage List for England as designated listed buildings.  Of these, one is listed at Grade I, and the other two at Grade II.  The parish contains part of the village of Shocklach, and is otherwise rural.  The listed buildings consist of a Norman church, a Medieval cross in the churchyard, and a farmhouse that was originally timber-framed.

Key

Buildings

See also
Listed buildings in Cuddington
Listed buildings in Farndon
Listed buildings in Stretton
Listed buildings in Tilston
Listed buildings in Malpas
Listed buildings in Chorlton

References

Listed buildings in Cheshire West and Chester
Lists of listed buildings in Cheshire